Coleophora omanica is a moth of the family Coleophoridae. It is found in Oman.

The wingspan is 6.5-7.5 mm.

References

omanica
Moths described in 2007
Moths of the Arabian Peninsula